Botcheston Bog is a  biological Site of Special Scientific Interest near Botcheston, west of Leicester.

This grazed marsh on peaty soil is dominated by carnation sedge, hard rush, creeping bent and meadowsweet. Other plants include several which are rare in the county.

The site is private land with no public access.

References

Sites of Special Scientific Interest in Leicestershire